Two car bombs exploded in Baghdad, Iraq at 12:20 on 12 February 2007 in the Shorja market district, killing 76 people, and injuring 155–180.

The explosions set market stalls, shops, and an adjoining 7-storey building on fire, causing further casualties, and local fire-crews struggled for hours to extinguish the flames. The collapse of a building was also reported. The injured were taken to the nearby Al-Kindi hospital, which struggled to cope with the influx, and more casualties are expected from injuries.

Al-Askari anniversary
The bombings happened during 15 minutes of state endorsed silence, to mark the anniversary of the Al-Askari Mosque bombing in Samarra, which prompted heavy bloodshed. The Iraqi Prime Minister Nouri al-Maliki was participating in a televised ceremony remembering the victims of the attack, and was speaking when the blasts occurred, only two miles away. Al-Maliki had been calling for calm, unity and reconciliation, and had said that the Iraqi Security Forces were regaining control of Iraq's security situation.

References

2007 murders in Iraq
Marketplace attacks in Iraq
Mass murder in 2007
Car and truck bombings in Iraq
Terrorist incidents in Iraq in 2007
Terrorist incidents in Baghdad
2000s in Baghdad
February 2007 events in Iraq
Building bombings in Iraq